New York Festivals, are a collection of related annual arts and media awards based in New York City. The awards include the New York Festivals Advertising Awards, "Advertising and Marketing Effectiveness" AME Awards, Bowery Awards, Global Awards, Radio Awards, TV & Film Awards and MIDAS Awards. They were established in 1957.

References

External links

International awards
Award ceremonies in the United States
Broadcasting awards
American websites
1957 establishments in New York City